Phryma oblongifolia is a species of flowering plant in the family Phrymaceae, native from temperate Asia southwards to the Himalayas and north Vietnam. It was first described by Gen-ichi Koidzumi in 1929. Its status as a separate species was not usually accepted, and it was treated as a variety of Phryma leptostachya. In 2014, the distinctiveness of North American P. leptostachya and Asian P. oblongifolia was supported, based on morphological evidence and a previous molecular phylogenetic study. , the species is recognized by Plants of the World Online.

References

Phrymaceae
Flora of temperate Asia
Flora of West Himalaya
Flora of Nepal
Flora of East Himalaya
Flora of Assam (region)
Flora of Vietnam
Plants described in 1929